There have been duchesses of Bouillon, in present-day Belgium, since the tenth century.

Lady of Bouillon

Ardennes-Bouillon dynasty, ?-1100

Sold to the Bishopric of Liège

House of La Marck, ?-1588

House of La Tour d'Auvergne, 1594–1794

Titular Duchess of Bouillon

House of La Tour d'Auvergne, 1794–1802

House of Rohan, 1816–1918 

The Congress of Vienna in 1816 awarded the title of Duke of Bouillon to the House of Rohan, descendants of 
Marie Louise de La Tour d'Auvergne.

In 1918 Austria became a republic and all noble titles were abolished.

Notes

 
Bouillon
Dukes of Bouillon
House of La Marck
La Tour d'Auvergne
House of Rohan